Abraham J. Zelmanowitz (December 30, 1945 – September 11, 2001) (also known as Abe, Avrame, and Avremel) was a computer programmer who worked for Empire Blue Cross and Blue Shield on the 27th floor of Tower One of the World Trade Center in New York City who died in the collapse of the north tower of the World Trade Center during the September 11 attacks in 2001.

September 11 attacks
On September 11, 2001, Zelmanowitz and co-worker, computer programmer Ed Beyea, a computer programmer at Empire BlueCross BlueShield, were on the 27th floor of the North Tower, waiting for evacuation following the collision of American Airlines Flight 11 with the building. According to Zelmanowitz's sister-in-law Evelyn Zelmanowitz, Beyea, who was one of Zelmanowitz's friends and a quadriplegic, could not evacuate the building on his own, and so Zelmanowitz phoned her at 9:30am and told her over the phone that he would remain with Beyea until a rescue team arrived to help carry Beyea from the building. Both men were killed when the North Tower collapsed.

President Bush mentioned Zelmanowitz's choice (although not Zelmanowitz by name) at the memorial prayer ceremony three days later, describing his action as heroic.

Nearly one year after his death, Zelmanowitz's remains were positively identified among the debris, and he was brought to the Mount of Olives Jewish Cemetery in Jerusalem, where he was interred beside his parents.

At the National 9/11 Memorial, Zelmanowitz is memorialized at the North Pool, on Panel N-65.

References

External links

 
Josie Byzek and Tim Gilmer. "September 11, 2001: A Day to Remember". New Mobility magazine

1945 births
2001 deaths
American Orthodox Jews
Victims of the September 11 attacks
American terrorism victims
Murdered American Jews
Terrorism deaths in New York (state)
People murdered in New York City
Male murder victims
Burials at the Jewish cemetery on the Mount of Olives